Gabriela Maria "Gabi" Zanotti Demoner (born 28 February 1985) is a Brazilian professional footballer who plays as a midfielder for Corinthians and the Brazil women's national team. She participated at the 2015 FIFA Women's World Cup.

Club career
Between the ages of nine and 14, Gabi played alongside her mother Nailza in a women's football team which competed at regional level. Between 2004 and 2006 she played for Kindermann, based in Santa Catarina. Gabi then played college soccer in the United States while attending Franklin Pierce University. She spent the 2010 season playing in the North American W-League for Hudson Valley Quickstrike Lady Blues. In 2008 she was with Boston Renegades, playing eight times and scoring one goal.

In 2011 Gabi played for Santos, but in early 2012 Santos' board of directors closed the club women's section. Gabi accompanied Maurine, Érika and several other displaced Santos players in transferring to Centro Olímpico.

International career
In July 2013 Gabi represented Brazil at the 2013 Summer Universiade in Kazan, Russia. She had already debuted for the senior national team, as a substitute in a 5–2 win over Mexico at the 2009 Torneio Internacional Cidade de São Paulo de Futebol Feminino.

Gabi was not included in the final squad for the 2011 FIFA Women's World Cup in Germany because she was not cleared by the Brazilian Football Confederation's (CBF) medical department.

She was named as an alternate for the Brazil squad at the 2012 London Olympics. In early 2015 Gabi was included in an 18-month residency programme intended to prepare Brazil's national team for the 2015 FIFA Women's World Cup in Canada and the 2016 Rio Olympics. At the World Cup, Gabi appeared in just one of Brazil's four matches, as part of a much-changed team in the 1–0 final group game win over Costa Rica.

After Brazil's 1–0 second round defeat by Australia, Gabi remained in Canada as part of the gold medal-winning Brazilian selection at the 2015 Pan American Games in Toronto.

International goals

References

External links

 Gabi Zanotti  – 2015 Pan American Games profile
 

1985 births
Living people
Brazilian women's footballers
Brazil women's international footballers
Brazilian expatriate women's footballers
2015 FIFA Women's World Cup players
Women's association football midfielders
Brazilian expatriate sportspeople in the United States
Expatriate women's soccer players in the United States
Associação Desportiva Centro Olímpico players
Santos FC (women) players
USL W-League (1995–2015) players
Chinese Women's Super League players
Dalian Quanjian F.C. players
Sport Club Corinthians Paulista (women) players
Brazilian expatriate sportspeople in China
Expatriate women's footballers in China
Universiade bronze medalists for Brazil
Universiade medalists in football
Pan American Games medalists in football
Pan American Games gold medalists for Brazil
Footballers at the 2015 Pan American Games
Medalists at the 2013 Summer Universiade
Medalists at the 2015 Pan American Games
Sportspeople from Espírito Santo
21st-century Brazilian women
Boston Renegades players